Otto Du Plessis Pass is situated in the Eastern Cape province of South Africa, on a gravel road between Ida and Clifford.

Mountain passes of the Eastern Cape